Mehrabad Rural District is in Bahman District of Abarkuh County, Yazd province, Iran. At the National Census of 2006, its population was 1,976 in 580 households. There were 2,047 inhabitants in 634 households at the following census of 2011. At the most recent census of 2016, the population of the rural district was 2,055 in 632 households. The largest of its 98 villages was Bedaf, with 1,111 people.

References 

Abarkuh County

Rural Districts of Yazd Province

Populated places in Yazd Province

Populated places in Abarkuh County